Moorefield Township, Ohio may refer to:
Moorefield Township, Clark County, Ohio
Moorefield Township, Harrison County, Ohio

Ohio township disambiguation pages